John E. Cheetham is an American composer and educator. He is professor emeritus at the University of Missouri where he was longtime Professor of Music Theory and Composition. His works have been widely performed in the United States and around the world. He was a member of the Columbia Community Band.

Early life and education
Born in Taos, New Mexico on January 13, 1939, Cheetham would go on to attend the University of New Mexico where he would earn both bachelor's and master's degrees. He would attain a Doctor of Musical Arts in composition from the University of Washington.

University of Missouri
Cheetham became Professor of Music Theory and Composition at the University of Missouri School of Music in 1969. During his career he would compose works for virtually all media and publish commercially. He retired from the University in 2000 and started his own label, Booneslick Press in 2001.

Works
ABA Symphonic March (1986)
Adios
Allusions
Booneslickers
Brass Menagerie
Canticle for Band (1965)
A Christmas Greeting
Colloquies
Commemorative Fanfare (1979)
Concertino
Concoctions for Trumpet
Divertimento
Dover Crossing
Eclectix
Elegy
Fanfare and Steeplechase
Fanfare for the Ozarks
Gaelic Variations
Glad Tidings
Ha' Penny March
In Memoriam Oklahoma City
Infinite Horizons (1991)
Journey of Three Rivers
Jubilus
Keystone Celebration (1989)
Kitty Hawk
Noel Francais
Open Ye Gates, Swing Wide Ye Portals
Overture "Silver Jubilee"
Partita Antico
Pavane
Reflections and Rattledance
Scherzo (1963)
Silhouettes
Sonata for Brass Quintet
Sonata for Trombone (2007)
Songs from the Open Range
Yuletide Offering

References

External links
booneslickpress.com

1939 births
Living people
20th-century classical composers
21st-century classical composers
American male classical composers
American classical composers
University of New Mexico alumni
University of Washington alumni
20th-century American composers
21st-century American composers
20th-century American male musicians
21st-century American male musicians
University of Missouri faculty
University of Missouri School of Music faculty
People from Taos, New Mexico
People from Columbia, Missouri
Composers from Columbia, Missouri